Jack Conley is an American actor particularly in the crime, mystery and thriller genres.

He is married to Francesca Casale, an actress.

Filmography

Film

Television

Videogames

References

External links
 

1958 births
American male film actors
American male television actors
American male voice actors
Living people
People from La Jolla, San Diego
20th-century American male actors
21st-century American male actors
American male stage actors
American male video game actors